Rosa 'Pink Wonder' (synonyms Kalinka, MEIhartfor) is a light pink floribunda rose cultivar. It was bred in 1970 by Meilland International in France.

Description
The flowers have an average diameter of 9 cm and a strong, sweet fragrance. They appear in small clusters of 3–7 throughout the season. 'Pink Wonder' has brilliant, dark green leaves and almost no thorns. The shrub reaches a height of 60 to 130 cm and a width of 1 m. It is winter hardy up  to −23.3 °C (USDA Zone 6a).

Awards
 Madrid Gold Medal 1969
 Belfast Gold Medal 1972

The sport 'Climbing Pink Wonder' is also popular, grows about 5 m tall and blooms repeatedly.

Sources 
Help Me Find
 Charles & Brigid Quest-Ritson: Rosen: die große Enzyklopädie / The Royal Horticultural Society; Übersetzung durch Susanne Bonn; Redaktion: Agnes Pahler; Starnberg: Dorling Kindersley, 2004,

External links 

Pink Wonder